The Toppila Power Station is a power station in the Toppila district in Oulu, Finland.  it is one of the largest peat-fired power stations in the world, with an installed capacity of  of electric power and 340 MW of thermal power. The boiler was supplied by Tampella and Ahlstrom, and the turbines were supplied by Zamech, LMZ and Ganz. The power station is operated by Oulun Energia.

In 2021 an estimated 2 million tonnes of peat was burnt in Finland. The EU is helping to fund a just transition away from this.

See also 

 Energy in Finland
 List of largest power stations in the world
 List of power stations in Finland

References 

Buildings and structures in Oulu
Peat-fired power stations in Finland